Saint-Thégonnec is a former commune in the Finistère department in Brittany in northwestern France. On 1 January 2016, it was merged into the new commune Saint-Thégonnec Loc-Eguiner.

The village is noted for its very elaborate parish close, one of a number in the area, which include Guimiliau and Lampaul-Guimiliau.

Population
Inhabitants of Saint-Thégonnec are called Saint-Thégonnecois.

Breton language
The municipality launched a linguistic plan through Ya d'ar brezhoneg on 25 March 2005.

Parish close
A parish close is an enclosed area around the parish church, including the church yard and a number of other features.

In common with others in the area, the Saint-Thégonnec close features a large ceremonial entrance arch, stressing the importance of the close as a focus for pilgrimage and pardons. An impressive calvary or crucifix forms the focus of the church yard. As at nearby Lampaul-Guimiliau, there is a separate charnel house or ossuary, with a life-sized tableau of the Entombment of Christ.

The interior of the church is exemplary of the local version of Baroque style, with a large quantity of  polychrome sculpture and decoration, including a spectacular pulpit.

See Saint-Thégonnec Parish close

See also
Communes of the Finistère department
Parc naturel régional d'Armorique
Yann Larhantec Sculptor of Calvaries including one in Saint-Thégonnec
List of the works of the Maître de Plougastel
List of the works of the Maître de Thégonnec

References

Twin city 
 Silverton, Devon, England, since 2008.

External links

Former communes of Finistère